Hungry Mother State Park is a state park in southwestern Virginia.

Much of the land for Hungry Mother State Park was donated by local landowners to develop a new state park in Smyth County on Hungry Mother Creek. The park is one of the six original CCC parks that opened in June 1936. The park was added to the National Register of Historic Places in 2007.

Origins of name
It has frequently been noted on lists of unusual place names. A legend states that when the Native Americans destroyed several settlements on the New River south of the park, Molly Marley and her small child were among the survivors taken to the raiders’ base north of the park. They eventually escaped, wandering through the wilderness eating berries. Molly finally collapsed, and her child wandered down a creek. Upon finding help, the only words the child could utter were "Hungry Mother." When the search party arrived at the foot of the mountain where Molly had collapsed, they found the child's mother dead. Today, that mountain is Molly's Knob (3,270 feet), and the stream is Hungry Mother Creek.

References

External links

Hungry Mother Official Site
Hemlock Haven Official Site

State parks of Virginia
Parks on the National Register of Historic Places in Virginia
Historic districts on the National Register of Historic Places in Virginia
National Register of Historic Places in Smyth County, Virginia
Parks in Smyth County, Virginia
Civilian Conservation Corps in Virginia
Protected areas established in 1936
1936 establishments in Virginia